Dalla faula is a species of butterfly in the family Hesperiidae. It is found in Mexico and Costa Rica.

Subspecies
Dalla faula faula - Mexico
Dalla faula lysis Schaus, 1913 - Costa Rica

References

Butterflies described in 1900
faula
Butterflies of North America
Taxa named by Frederick DuCane Godman